Song of the Trail is a 1936 American Western film directed by Russell Hopton and starring Kermit Maynard, Evelyn Brent and Andrea Leeds.

Cast
 Kermit Maynard as Jim Carter 
 Evelyn Brent as Myra 
 Fuzzy Knight as Pudge 
 Andrea Leeds as Betty Hobson
 George 'Gabby' Hayes as Dan Hobson 
 Lynette London as Marie 
 Wheeler Oakman as Bob Arnold 
 Lee Shumway as Stone 
 Roger Williams as Miller 
 Charles McMurphy as Curtis 
 Ray Gallagher as Al Blore 
 Horace Murphy as Sheriff

References

Bibliography
 Michael R. Pitts. Poverty Row Studios, 1929–1940: An Illustrated History of 55 Independent Film Companies, with a Filmography for Each. McFarland & Company, 2005.

External links
 

1936 films
1936 Western (genre) films
American Western (genre) films
Films directed by Russell Hopton
Films based on works by James Oliver Curwood
1930s English-language films
1930s American films